Paul Harvey (born 3 April 1966) is an English professional darts player who plays in World Darts Federation events.

His only title to date was the BDO Malta Open in 2011.

References

External links
Profile and stats on Darts Database

1966 births
Living people
English darts players
People from Gedling (district)
Sportspeople from Nottinghamshire
Professional Darts Corporation associate players